Cavendish University Uganda (CUU) is licensed and accredited by the Uganda National Council for Higher Education (UNCHE), and was established in 2008. It is ranked 20th best university in Uganda and 10593th in the world.

Location
CUU's main campus is located at 1469 Ggaba Road, in Nsambya, a southern neighborhood of Kampala, the capital and largest city of Uganda.

In August 2016, the university established a second campus in the Bukoto neighborhood, to accommodate law and health sciences faculties.

Overview
Cavendish University Uganda (CUU) is a higher institution of learning that was granted a letter of interim authority on 18 December 2007 to establish a private university under the Universities and Tertiary Institutions Act No. 7 of 2001.

CUU is fully licensed and accredited by the Uganda National Council for Higher Education (UNCHE), and was established in 2008.

The student-centric academic model of CUU deploys global best practices in teaching and learning and is aimed at fulfilling the Mission of CUU which is to transform students into responsible, educated, employable and entrepreneurial citizens.

Cavendish University Uganda offers market-relevant and accredited academic programmes which are hosted in its four Faculties of Law, Science & Technology, Business & Management, and Socio–Economic Sciences. There is also a School of Postgraduate Studies & Research.

Learning at CUU is innovative, student-centric, participatory, active and practical. A technology platform is deployed to support blended learning, projects, case studies, distance learning, and other forms of effective and active learning.

Cavendish University Uganda has a large student population hailing from over 15 different countries. More than 5,000 students have graduated from CUU in many different disciplines at certificate, diploma, bachelor's and master's levels since its inception.

History
The university opened with 45 students in the premises formerly occupied by Makerere High School on Makerere Hill. The student body grew to over 250 in 2009. In 2010, CUU moved to its campus on Ggaba Road, opposite the American Embassy.

Notable alumni

Political figures and government employees
Persis Namuganza, Ugandan politician and the state minister for lands in the Cabinet of Uganda.

Film, television and radio
Bettinah Tianah, Ugandan television personality, actress, model, and fashionista.

Library resources 
The university has a total of 5 library branches spread in different parts of Uganda, each representing a Campus or study centre, with electronic resources accessed through the country's consortium of Uganda University Libraries CUUL.

Courses offered
The following programmes are currently offered at CUU:

Postgraduate Programmes
 Master of Business Administration
 Master of Business Administration - Accounting & Finance
 Master of Business Administration - Marketing
Master of Business Administration - Management
 Master of Business Administration - Entrepreneurship
 Master of Business Administration - Human Resources Management
 Master of Business Administration - Procurement & Supply Chain Management
 Master of Laws (LLM)
 Master of Public Health
 Master of Arts in International Relations & Diplomatic Studies
Master of Science in Project Management
Master of Security Studies

Postgraduate Diplomas 

 Postgraduate Diploma in Business Administration (PGD BA)

Undergraduate Programmes
 Bachelor of Business Administration: Generic
 Bachelor of Business Administration- Banking & Finance
 Bachelor of Business Administration- Accounting & Finance
 Bachelor of Business Administration- Procurement & Logistics
 Bachelor of Business Administration- Human Resource Management
Bachelor of Business Administration - Management
 Bachelor of Arts in International Relations and Diplomatic Studies
 Bachelor of Science in Computer Science
 Bachelor of Information Technology
 Bachelor of Journalism & Communication Studies (Public Relations/Mass Communication)
 Bachelor of Laws
 Bachelor of Public Health
 Bachelor of Science in Environmental Health Science
Bachelor of Science in Software Engineering
Bachelors in Economics and Statistics
Bachelor of Arts in Public Administration and Management
Bachelor of Mass Communication and Journalism
Bachelor of Environmental Health Science

Diplomas
 Diploma in Computer Science
 Diploma in Information Technology

See also
Makindye Division
List of universities in Uganda
Education in Uganda

References

External links
 British Film Producer Challenges His Expulsion From Uganda

Universities and colleges in Uganda
Makindye Division
Educational institutions established in 2008
2008 establishments in Uganda
Central Region, Uganda